Gudur Assembly constituency is a SC (Scheduled Caste) reserved constituency of the Andhra Pradesh Legislative Assembly, India. It is one among 7 constituencies in the Tirupati district.

Varaprasad Rao Velagapalli of Yuvajana Sramika Rythu Congress Party is currently representing the constituency.

Overview
It is part of the Tirupati Lok Sabha constituency along with another six Vidhan Sabha segments, namely, Sarvepalli, Sullurpeta, Venkatagiri in Nellore district and Tirupati, Srikalahasti, Satyavedu in Chittoor district.

Mandals

Members of Legislative Assembly

Election results

1952

2004

2009

2014

2019

References

Assembly constituencies of Andhra Pradesh